Cytochrome P450 4F8 is a protein that in humans is encoded by the CYP4F8 gene.

Function 
This gene, CYP4F8, encodes a member of the cytochrome P450 superfamily of enzymes. The cytochrome P450 proteins are monooxygenases which catalyze many reactions involved in drug metabolism and synthesis of cholesterol, steroids and other lipids. This protein localizes to the endoplasmic reticulum and functions as a 19-hydroxylase of the arachidonic acid metabolite, prostaglandin H2 (PGH2) and the Dihomo-γ-linolenic acid metabolite PGH1 in seminal vesicles. This gene is part of a cluster of cytochrome P450 genes on chromosome 19. Another member of this family, CYP4F3, is approximately 18 kb away. In addition to seminal vesicles, CYP4F8 is expressed in kidney, prostate, epidermis, and corneal epithelium, and its mRNA has been found in retina; CYP4F8 is also greatly up-regulated in psoriatic skin.

In addition to its ability to metabolize and presumably thereby to inactivate or reduce the activity of PGH2 and PGH1, CYP4F8 adds hydroxyl residues to carbons 18 and 19 of arachidonic acid and Dihomo-γ-linolenic acid, CYP458 possesses epoxygenase activity in that it metabolizes the omega-3 fatty acids, docosahexaenoic acid (DHA) and eicosapentaenoic acid, (EPA) to their corresponding epoxides, the epoxydocosapentaenoic acids (EDPs) and epoxyeicosatetraenoic acids (EEQs), respectively. The enzyme metabolizes DHA primarily to 19R,20S-epoxyeicosapentaenoic acid and 19S,20R-epoxyeicosapentaenoic acid isomers (termed 19,20-EDP) and EPA primarily to 17R,18S-eicosatetraenoic acid and 17S,18R-eicosatetraenoic acid isomers (termed 17,18-EEQ). 19-HETE is an inhibitor of 20-HETE, a broadly active signaling molecule which acts to constrict arterioles, elevate blood pressure, promote inflammation responses, and stimulates the growth of various types of tumor cells; however the in vivo ability and significance of 19-HETE in inhibiting 20-HETE has not been demonstrated (see 20-Hydroxyeicosatetraenoic acid). The EDPs (see Epoxydocosapentaenoic acid) and EEQs (see epoxyeicosatetraenoic acid) have a broad range of activities. In various animal models and in vitro studies on animal and human tissues, they decrease hypertension and pain perception; suppress inflammation; inhibit angiogenesis, endothelial cell migration and endothelial cell proliferation; and inhibit the growth and metastasis of human breast and prostate cancer cell lines. It is suggested that the EDP and EEQ metabolites function in humans as they do in animal models and that, as products of the omega-3 fatty acids, DHA acid and EPA, the EDP and EEQ metabolites contribute to many of the beneficial effects attributed to dietary omega-3 fatty acids.  EDP and EEQ metabolites are short-lived, being inactivated within seconds or minutes of formation by epoxide hydrolases, particularly soluble epoxide hydrolase, and therefore act locally.

CYP4F8 has little activity in omega-hydroxylating leukotriene B4, prostaglandin D2, prostaglandin E2, prostaglandin E1, or prostaglandin F2.

The fatty acid metabolizing activity, including the ability to form epoxides, of CYP4F8 is very similar to that of CYP4F12.  However, it and CYP4F12 are not regarded as being major contributors in forming the cited epoxides in humans although they might do so in tissues where they are highly expressed.

References

Further reading